Mutuaura is a commune on the island of Rimatara, in French Polynesia. According to the 2017 census, it had a population of 315 people. It is in the Tahiti Time (TAHT) time zone.

References

Communes of French Polynesia